Mette Grøtteland (born 1969) became the first female fighter pilot in the Royal Norwegian Air Force after qualifying to fly jet fighter aircraft in 1992.

Early life
Grøtteland was born in 1969 in Sandnes, Norway.

Military service
In 1991, then a second lieutenant, Grøtteland was sent to the United States to undergo fighter training. Returning to Norway on 3 March 1992, she became the first Norwegian female fighter pilot. She was nicknamed "Jet-Mette".

In Norway, Grøtteland joined No. 332 Squadron RNoAF at Rygge Air Station and first flew Northrop F-5 fighter aircraft, before converting to flying General Dynamics F-16 Fighting Falcon fighters in the autumn of 1992. She transferred to No. 331 Squadron RNoAF at Bodø Air Station at the beginning of 1993. By 2000 Grøtteland held the rank of captain, and was again based at Rygge Air Station.

In 2006 she converted to flying helicopters and began her service as a Westland Sea King helicopter pilot in 2007, transferring to No. 330 Squadron RNoAF at Sola Air Station. At the time she was one of three female rescue helicopter pilots in Norway.

References

Bibliography
 
 

1969 births
Living people
People from Sandnes
Royal Norwegian Air Force personnel
No. 330 Squadron RNoAF personnel
Norwegian expatriates in the United States
Women aviators
Norwegian aviators
Norwegian female military personnel
Helicopter pilots
Norwegian women aviators